Anthonio may refer to:

 A derivative of the given name Antonio
 "Anthonio" (song), by Annie
 Anthonio Hurdt, Dutch East India Company officer in Indonesia
 Fort Anthonio, a historical building in Tamsui
 Antonio Roque Gobbo, writer

See also

Anthoni, name
Anthonij, given name
Antonio, given name